South Marchian is an East Central German dialect. The Berlin dialect is affected by this dialect. The peculiarity of this dialect is the fact that it combines Low German and High German characteristics in a large area. This can be explained by the transformation of the Middle Low German dialect, which was also spoken in Frankfurt (Oder), by the High German influence into an East Central German dialect.

References
 

Culture in Berlin
Dialects by location
Central German languages
German dialects
Languages of Germany